Fisher Peak is a peak rising to about ,  southeast of Mount Leek, in the Hauberg Mountains of Antarctica. It was mapped by the United States Geological Survey (USGS) from surveys and U.S. Navy aerial photographs, 1961–67, and was climbed in December 1977 by members of a USGS field party. It was named by the Advisory Committee on Antarctic Names in 1985 after Commander Dwight David Fisher, U.S. Navy, command pilot on the first landing by LC-130 Hercules aircraft on English Coast in December 1984; Commanding Officer, U.S. Navy Antarctic Development Squadron Six (VXE-6), from May 1984 to May 1985; Commanding Officer, Naval Support Force, Antarctica, 1987–89; Naval Officer on detail to the National Science Foundation (NSF), 1989–92; Deputy Manager, Polar Operations Section, Office of Polar Programs at the NSF, from 1992.

References 

Mountains of Palmer Land